Sonja Bennett (born August 24, 1980) is a Canadian actress and screenwriter. Her film debut was in the Canadian feature film Punch (2002), for which she won the Vancouver Film Critics Circle Award for Best Actress in a Canadian Film. She has since starred in the films Donovan's Echo, Cole, Control Alt Delete, Young People Fucking, and Fido as well as the television series Godiva's and Cold Squad. In 2014, Bennett made her screenwriting debut with Preggoland in which she also starred.

Early life and education
Born in Vancouver, British Columbia on August 24, 1980, Bennett is the daughter of director/writer Guy Bennett and Anna Hart. She was raised mainly by her mother, living in several locations. She is a graduate of Garibaldi Secondary School in Maple Ridge, British Columbia. She attended the University of British Columbia for two years on an academic scholarship. Following that, she attended Langara College in Vancouver,  and enrolled in the Studio 58 program.

Career

Television work
On the small screen, Bennett played recurring roles on the NBC series Battlestar Galactica, Warner Brothers' Traveler, New Line television series Blade as well as Eureka, Dead Zone and Cold Squad. She has played guest starring roles on the series Supernatural, Stargate Atlantis, Psych, Painkiller Jane, John Doe. Bennett also had a recurring role as the character Vivian Adams in Mistresses (2015), and starred in the Bravo!/CityTV series, Godiva's from 2005-2006.

Film work
Bennett starred in the 2002 film Punch, which her father, Guy Bennett, wrote and directed. The movie was her feature film debut and led to her being awarded Best Actress by the Vancouver Film Critics Circle. She has since starred in the films Donovan's Echo, Cole, Control Alt Delete, Young People Fucking, and Fido. She wrote the screenplay, her first, for the 2014 film Preggoland, in which she also starred.

Awards and nominations
 In 2002 she got a 'Special Citation' in the Women In Film And Video Vancouver Artistic Merit Award category at the Vancouver International Film Festival for Punch (2002).
 In 2003 she won the Best Canadian Actress in a Lead Role of the Vancouver Film Critics Circle for Punch (2002).
 In 2005 she was nominated for a Leo Award, for Best Supporting Performance by a Female for Dramatic Series for the Godiva's episode, Having Her Cake, and for a Gemini Award for Best Performance by an Actress in a Featured Supporting Role in a Dramatic Series for Cold Squad, for the episode Righteous.
 In 2006 she was twice nominated for the Leo at the Leo Awards for Best Supporting Performance by a Female in a Dramatic Series for Godiva's (2005) for episodes Dead Flowers and Out the Door.
 In 2008 she won the award for Best Supporting Actress in a Canadian Film of the Vancouver Film Critics Circle for Young People Fucking (2007).
 In 2010 she was nominated for Best Supporting Actress in a Feature Film at the Leo Awards for Cole (2009).

Filmography

Film

Television

References

Further reading
 Leo Awards compilations, covering the actress and years in question.

External links
 Biography of Bennett on Tribute.ca
 
 

1980 births
Living people
Canadian film actresses
Canadian television actresses
Actresses from Vancouver
University of British Columbia alumni
21st-century Canadian actresses
Screenwriters from British Columbia
Writers from Vancouver
Canadian Film Centre alumni